The de Havilland Gipsy Minor or Gipsy Junior is a British four-cylinder, air-cooled, inline engine that was used primarily in the de Havilland Moth Minor monoplane, both products being developed in the late 1930s.

Design and development
The engine was a simplified and smaller version of the earlier de Havilland Gipsy. It featured only one magneto where dual ignition was normal for the Gipsy series of engines. A total of 171 engines were produced, including 100 built in Australia, production moving to that country due to the start of the Second World War.

Applications
De Havilland Moth Minor
Short Scion
Druine Turbi

Engines on display
A de Havilland Gipsy Minor engine is on public display at the de Havilland Aircraft Heritage Centre, London Colney, Hertfordshire.

Specifications (Gipsy Minor)

See also

References

Notes

Bibliography

 Lumsden, Alec. British Piston Engines and their Aircraft. Marlborough, Wiltshire: Airlife Publishing, 2003. .

Air-cooled aircraft piston engines
Gipsy Minor
1930s aircraft piston engines
Inverted aircraft piston engines